Gregory Davis (born 1979) is an English spree killer and former art student who was convicted of the double manslaughter of Dorothy Rogers and her son Michael Rogers in 2003. He was released in 2011 from Littlemore Hospital.

Early life
Gregory Davis was born to a respectable family residing in Great Linford, Buckinghamshire, England as the son of a civil engineer and a care assistant. He attended secondary school at The Radcliffe School.

Art studies
Davis first studied art during his sixth form, and later at Northampton University. One of his works of art made during this period consisted of a trophy plaque bearing the names of his favourite serial killers.

Murders
Davis himself planned to be a serial killer and used his diary to plot to murder. Progressing on a diary entry that spoke of a desire to kill ad infinitum "all over the world" he eventually went on a murder spree on 28 January 2003. Working his way through a compiled hit list he first paid visit to Stewart Johnson who escaped as kitchen fitters were working in his home. Davis then continued down the list to Stantonbury, to the home of Dorothy Rogers.

Victims
Dorothy Rogers, a 48-year-old divorcee, was stabbed 31 times at her home in Stantonbury.
Michael Rogers, aged 19, was stabbed, bludgeoned and disembowelled at a children's playground.
Mick Cowles was attacked with a hammer and seriously wounded.

Trial and imprisonment
On 15 December 2003, Davis stood trial at Luton Crown Court and pleaded guilty to manslaughter on the grounds of diminished responsibility. Mr Justice Richard Aikens accepted the plea after a team of five psychiatrists diagnosed him with major depressive disorder, social anxiety disorder, alcohol dependence and to be suffering from a psychotic episode at the time of the crime. He was given an indefinite sentence to be served at Broadmoor Hospital. In 2009, he was transferred to Littlemore Hospital where he was allowed out on short release.

A Mental Health Review Tribunal decided he would be released in July 2011.

References
https://theywalkamonguspodcast.com/new-episodes/2019/3/27/season-3-episode-38

1979 births
Living people
21st-century criminals
2003 crimes in the United Kingdom
British spree killers
Crime in Buckinghamshire
English people convicted of manslaughter
People from Milton Keynes
People acquitted by reason of insanity
People detained at Broadmoor Hospital
People with mood disorders